Stylidium schoenoides is a species of dicotyledon plant of the Stylidium genus, from Stylidiaceae family, Asterales order, first described by Augustin Pyramus de Candolle in 1839. The plant is endemic to Western Australia.

Description
Stylidium schoenoides is a perennial herb growing to a height from .15 to 0.5 m high. The leaves form a rosette and are 14–35 cm by 1-1.8 mm and hairless, though there are membraneous scale leaves present at base of mature leaves. The flower stalk has glandular hairs and long soft weak hairs. The white-cream flowers may be seen from  August to November.

Habitat
It grows on sand, sandy loam, and granite,  on hillslopes, dunes, and plains, in forests, heaths, woodland and shrublands.

References 
<references>
</ref>

World Plants: Synonymic Checklists of the Vascular Plants of the World</ref>
</references>

schoenoides
Plants described in 1839
Taxa named by Augustin Pyramus de Candolle
Flora of Western Australia